Orazio Giaccio (fl. 1610s) was an Italian composer. His canzonette Laberinto amoroso was published in Naples by Gargano and Nucci in 1618.

References

17th-century Italian composers
Italian Baroque composers
Italian male classical composers
17th-century male musicians